Nangar Khel (also: Nangarkhēl, Nangar Kheyl) is a village in the Paktika Province, southeastern Afghanistan, located in the mountains at the altitude of .

See also
Nangar Khel incident
Paktika Province

References

Populated places in Paktika Province